Area codes 815 and 779 are telephone area codes in the North American Numbering Plan (NANP) for most of northern Illinois outside the Chicago and Quad Cities areas. It also serves the Joliet area and some of Chicago’s western and northwestern exurbs. 815 was one of the four original Illinois area codes set up in 1947. Area code 779 was assigned to the same numbering plan area in 2009 to form an overlay.

History
When the American Telephone and Telegraph Company (AT&T) created the first nationwide telephone numbering plan for Operator Toll Dialing in 1947, the state of Illinois was divided into four numbering plan areas (NPAs), generally laid out as a southern, central, and northern area, and a region around and including the city of Chicago. The northern NPA was assigned area code 815 in the group of 86 original North American area codes.

In 1957, the 815 numbering plan area was divided roughly in half along a north-westerly to south-easterly running line, assigning area code 309 to its western part, including the Illinois side of the Quad Cities. The new area code was one of the first area codes not serving an entire state, but having the digit 0 in the middle position of the code. It was the only new area code created in Illinois between 1947 and the 1989 creation of area code 708. When forming 309 the area was combined with part of the northern portion of area code 217.

In preparation of an overlay plan with the new area code 779, all calls from the 815 area needed to be dialed with an area code beginning on February 17, 2009. A month later, area code 779 was activated.

Service area

Adeline
Amboy
Andres
Apple River
Argyle
Aroma Park
Ashkum
Ashton
Baileyville
Ballou
Belvidere
Bonfield
Bourbonnais
Braceville
Bradley
Braidwood
Brush Point
Buckingham
Buffalo Grove
Bull Valley
Byron
Caledonia
Capron
Carbon Hill
Cedar Point
Cedarville
Chadwick
Chana
Channahon
Cherry Valley
Clifton
Coal City
Coleta
Coltonville
Compton
Coral
Cortland
Crest Hill
Creston
Crystal Lake
Crystal Lawns
Dakota
Dana
Danforth
Davis
Davis Junction
Daysville
Deer Grove
DeKalb
Diamond
Dixon
Durand
Dwight
Earlville
East Brooklyn
East Dubuque
Egan
Eleroy
Elizabeth
Elwood
Esmond
Essex
Fairdale
Fairmont
Flagg Center 
Forreston
Frankfort
Frankfort Square
Franklin Grove
Freeport
Fulton
Galena
Genoa
Garden Prairie
Gardner
German Valley
Gilman
Godley
Grand Detour
Grand Ridge
Grant Park
Granville
Greenwood
Haldane
Hanover
Harmon
Harrison
Harvard
Hebron
Herscher
Holiday Hills
Homer Glen
Hillcrest
Hinckley
Hopkins Park
Ingalls Park
Irwin
Johnsburg
Joliet
Kangley
Kankakee
Kent
Kings
Kingston
Kinsman
Kirkland
Lake Holiday
Lake Summerset
Lakemoor
Lakewood
Lakewood Shores
Lanark
LaSalle
Leaf River
Lee
Leland
Lena
Leonore
Lindenwood
Lisbon
Lockport
Lostant
Loves Park
Lyndon
Machesney Park
Malta
Manhattan
Manteno
Maple Park
Marengo
Marseilles
Mazon
McCullom Lake
McHenry
Mendota
Menominee
Meriden
Millbrook
Milledgeville
Millington
Minooka
Mokena
Momence
Monee
Monroe Center
Morris
Morrison
Mount Carroll
Mount Morris
Naplate
Nelson
New Milford
New Lenox
Newark
Nora
North Utica
Norway
Odell
Oglesby
Onarga
Oneco
Orangeville
Oregon
Ottawa
Paw Paw
Paynes Point
Pearl City
Pecatonica
Peotone
Peru
Plainfield
Polo
Pontiac
Poplar Grove
Prairie Grove
Preston Heights
Princeton
Prophetstown
Ransom
Reddick
Richmond
Ridott
Ringwood
Ritchie
Rochelle
Rock City
Rock Falls
Rockdale
Rockford
Rockton
Rodden
Romeoville
Roscoe
Rutland
St. Anne
Sandwich
Savanna
Scales Mound
Seneca
Serena
Seward
Shabbona
Shannon
Sheridan
Shirland
Shorewood
Somonauk
South Beloit
South Wilmington
Spring Grove
Spring Valley
Sterling
Steward
Stillman Valley
Stockton
Streator
Sublette
Sun River Terrace
Sycamore
Symerton
Tampico
Thomson
Timberlane
Toluca
Tonica
Triumph
Troy Grove
Union
Union Hill
Verona
Waddams Grove
Walnut
Warren
Waterman
Watseka
West Brooklyn
Wenona
Wilmington
Wilton
Wilton Center
Winnebago
Winslow
Wonder Lake
Wonder Lake (CDP)
Woodstock
Woosung

See also
 List of North American Numbering Plan area codes
 List of Illinois area codes

References

External links

 Area Code Overlay Approved for 815 Area Code - general information from AT&T, the RBOC for the area code

Telecommunications-related introductions in 1947
Telecommunications-related introductions in 2007
815 and 779
815 and 779